The Central District of Qazvin County is a district (bakhsh) in Qazvin County, Qazvin Province, Iran. At the 2006 census, its population was 469,367, in 125,770 families.  The District has three cities: Qazvin, Eqbaliyeh, and Mahmudabad Nemuneh. The District has two rural districts (dehestan): Eqbal-e Gharbi Rural District, and Eqbal-e Sharqi Rural District. Persians, Azeris and Tats are the largest ethnic groups of the Central District of Qazvin County.

References 

Districts of Qazvin Province
Qazvin County